Horst Schade (10 July 1922 – 28 February 1968) was a German football player and manager.

Schade began his career with Dresdner SC in 1941, and went on to play for Döbelner SC, FC Haidhof, SpVgg Fürth and 1. FC Nürnberg. He was also capped three times for the West Germany national team.

References

External links

1922 births
1968 deaths
People from Döbeln
German footballers
Association football forwards
Germany international footballers
Dresdner SC players
SpVgg Greuther Fürth players
1. FC Nürnberg players
SpVgg Greuther Fürth managers
Footballers from Saxony
German football managers